Ocean University of Sri Lanka was established in 2014 by an act passed by the Parliament of Sri Lanka. It was earlier called the National Institute of Fisheries and Nautical Engineering. The objective of the university is to conduct academic and professional education and vocational training activities in fisheries, marine and nautical engineering to fulfill and develop the needs of the fisheries and allied sector in Sri Lanka.

The Ocean University of Sri Lanka Main Campus is located in Colombo in Crow Island, Mattakuliya, Colombo 15. There are seven regional centers in addition to main campus at Crow Island. They are:

 Tangalle
 Kalutara
 Galle
 Batticaloa
 Trincomalee
 Negombo
 Jaffna

Administration  
Vice- chancellor - Prof. Wasantha Rathnayake

Deans - 

 Faculty of Fisheries and Ocean Science - Dr. M.F.M. Fairoz

Heads of Departments -

 Faculty of Engineering and Management 
 Department of Maritime Transportation Management and Logistics - Mrs. Dilini Manage
Department of Coastal & Marine Resources Management - Dr H.B.Jayasiri
 Faculty of Fisheries and Ocean Science 
Dr. W. A. A. Dimuthu Lanka Wickramasinghe

Director (Training) - Mr. P. U. I. Perera

Senior Assistant Internal Auditor - Mr. K. V. A. Wijenayaka

Assistant Director Media & Information Services - Mr. C. Rajapaksha

Register - Mr. K. R. S. Hemantha

Faculties 
The university consists of two Faculties and one postgraduate institute and several divisions. The two faculties are:

 Faculty of Engineering and Management
 Faculty of Fisheries and Ocean Science

Faculty of Engineering and Management

Department of Marine Engineering 
The department of Marine Engineering conducts BSc (Hons) Marine Engineering for the undergraduate students in the Crow Island main campus.

Department of Maritime Transportation Management and Logistics 
The head of Department of Transportation Management and Logistics is Mrs. Dilini Manage. It conducts the BSc (Hons) Maritime Transportation Management and Logistics, BSc (Hons) Coastal and Marine Resources Management. The MSc in Integrated Coastal Management (ICM) is also conducted by the department for the graduates.

Faculty of Fisheries and Ocean Science 
The dean of the Faculty of Fisheries and Ocean Science is Dr. M.F.M. Fairoz while the head of the department is Dr. W. A. A. Dimuthu Lanka Wickramasinghe.            It Conducts BSc (Hons) Fisheries & Marine Science for undergraduate scholars.

Diploma and Certificate Programs

Diploma Programs 
There are several diplomas also conducted by the university that are not at degree level. They are;

 Maritime & Logistic Management (NVQ level 5/6)
 Fishing Technology (NVQ level 5)
 Aquaculture & Aquatic Resource Management (NVQ level 5/6)
 Marine Engineering

Certificate Programs 
The objective of the university is to conduct academic and professional education and vocational training activities in fisheries, marine and nautical engineering to fulfill and develop the needs of the fisheries and allied sector. According to the objective the university conducting special certificate programs for the development of the fisheries sector. They are;

 Marine Welding
 Scuba
 Fishing Vessel Skipper
 Life Guard
 Machinist
 Fiber-grass Technician
 Ornamental Fish Culture and Management
 Air Conditioning & Refrigerate Technician
 Marine Chart Reading, Communication and Operation of Satellite Navigators (GPS)
 Out Board Mechanic
 Computer Graphics Designer
 Computer Application Assistance

The library 
The University Library started at main campus Crow Island premises in 2009 with a small collection of 110 valuable books on Biology, English Language and Computer Science. With the establishment of Degree programmes which are Marine Engineering, Logistics Management and Coastal Management, the library collection was developed gradually. Today the collection is included valuable text books according to these degree programmes and other fields which are vital for the students, academic staff and researchers. It also has a collection of valuable rare references.

References

External links

Universities in Sri Lanka
2014 establishments in Sri Lanka
Educational institutions established in 2014
Universities and colleges in Colombo